Marshall Black (February 19, 1870 – March 27, 1934) was an American politician.  He was born in Ohio in 1870, and attended Ohio Wesleyan University and Stanford University. He served in the California State Assembly for the 57th district from 1903 to 1905 and  California Senate for the 28th district from 1907 to 1913.

In 1911 he wrote the bill that extended the use of recall election to include local and city officials.  Two years later, he was accused of embezzlement for stealing $140,000 from the Palo Alto Building and Loan of which he was secretary and recalled from office.  He was then found guilty and sentenced to three years and four months in prison at San Quentin.

He was replaced by Herbert C. Jones.

References

California politicians convicted of crimes
Republican Party members of the California State Assembly
Republican Party California state senators
20th-century American politicians
Recalled state legislators of the United States
1870 births
1934 deaths